Pteronarctos is a genus of basal pinnipediform from middle Miocene marine deposits in Oregon.

Two species of Pteronarctos are known, P. goedertae and P. piersoni. Although originally described as a member of Enaliarctidae, cladistic analyses place Pteronarctos as sister to pinnipeds, in the clade Pinnipediformes.

References

External links
Enaliarctos at The Paleobiology Database

Miocene pinnipeds
Prehistoric pinnipeds of North America
Prehistoric carnivoran genera
Fossil taxa described in 1988